Feltonville can refer to any of several places in the United States:

Feltonville, Massachusetts - the former name of Hudson, Massachusetts
Feltonville, North Carolina
Feltonville, Philadelphia, Pennsylvania - a neighborhood of Philadelphia, Pennsylvania